You Kiss Like a God is a 2009 Czech comedy film directed by Marie Poledňáková. Upon its release, it became the most watched film in Czech theatres.

Plot
Helena Altmanová (Kamila Magálová), a high school teacher, lives in an apartment with her ex-husband Karel (Jiří Bartoška), a successful writer, even after being divorced. Their extended family lives with them as well, including their son Adam (Roman Vojtek), his wife Bela (Martha Issová), their sons Bastík (Filip Antonio) and Max, Helen's sister Kristýna (Nela Boudová), a widow with three children, and the matriarch of the family, Alžběta (Jaroslava Adamová), still vital even in her 70s. Helena has little time left for her own life, what with everything going on around her. One day, she meets a man named František (Oldřich Kaiser), a doctor with whom she quickly falls in love. František, however, is "kinda married", and his wife Bohunka (Eva Holubová) does not share his ideas about an open relationship. A series of humorous events transpires as the story progresses.

Cast and characters
 Kamila Magálová as Helena
 Jiří Bartoška as Karel
 Eva Holubová as Bohunka
 Oldřich Kaiser as František
 Nela Boudová as Kristýna
 Roman Vojtek as Adam
 Martha Issová as Bela
 Jaroslava Adamová as Alžběta
 Arnošt Lustig as Arnošt
 Filip Antonio as Bastík

External links
 

2009 comedy films
2009 films
2000s Czech-language films
Films directed by Marie Poledňáková
Czech comedy films
2000s Czech films